Douglas Rae (born 22 June 1947, Edinburgh) is a Scottish television producer and executive, and a former children's television presenter.

Rae presented the long-running Thames Television children's series Magpie, taking over from Pete Brady in 1971 and remaining until 1977. He then moved behind the camera, becoming an executive producer on series including the BBC serial Monarch of the Glen and Bloomsbury Group drama Life in Squares (2015).

References

External links

1947 births
Living people
Television people from Edinburgh
Scottish television producers
Scottish television presenters
Scottish television executives